Gazélec Football Club Ajaccio, commonly referred to as GFC Ajaccio, GFCA, Gazélec Ajaccio or simply Gazélec, was a French football club from Ajaccio, Corsica. Founded in 1910, Gazélec played one season of Ligue 1 in 2015–16 and was dissolved in 2023.

History
The club was founded in 1960 as result of the merger of two small Ajaccio clubs, Football Club Ajaccien (commonly known as FC Ajaccio), founded in 1930 and Gazélec Corse Club, founded in 1910.

Gazélec reached the semi-finals of the 2011–12 Coupe de France, while playing in the third-tier Championnat National. They hosted home games in the later rounds at the larger Stade François Coty, home of AC Ajaccio.

On 15 May 2015, Gazélec were promoted to Ligue 1 for the first time in the club's history, following a 3–2 win over Niort with two goals by John Tshibumbu. It was their second consecutive promotion and fourth in five years.  The team started off the 2015–16 Ligue 1 season as one of the smallest teams to compete in the division's history. They were instantly relegated, in 19th place. In June 2019, the club were relegated to the third tier after a play-off loss to Le Mans. They were relegated again at the end of the truncated 2019–20 Championnat National season, after being in the relegation places when the season was halted due to the COVID-19 pandemic. In 2021, they suffered administrative relegation to  the fifth-tier Championnat National 3 for financial reasons.

On 20 December 2022, following the initiation of criminal proceedings against its president of two months, receivership proceedings were commenced by the commercial court of Ajaccio. On 23 January 2023 the club appeared at the commercial court again, where a decision to liquidate it was tabled, under advisement for one week. A week later, the court confirmed the decision, leading to the suspension of the two senior teams of the club from Championnat National 3 and Régional 2, and their results for the season being expunged.

Honours
 Ligue 2
 Runners-up: 2014–15

 Championnat de France Amateurs
 Champions: 1963, 1965, 1966, 1968, 2002–03, 2010–11

 Corsican Championship
 Champions: 1937, 1938, 1956, 1957, 1961

Rivalries
The club had rivalries with the other two Corsican professional clubs: SC Bastia and AC Ajaccio, the latter one playing the  Ajaccio Derby with Gazélec. For many years, Gazélec played in a lower division than their city rivals. The side also had a rivalry with an another smaller club on the island, FC Bastia-Borgo.

Coaches

References

Gazélec Ajaccio
Association football clubs established in 1910
Football clubs in Corsica
1910 establishments in France
Defunct football clubs in France
Ajaccio
Sport in Corse-du-Sud
Ligue 1 clubs
2023 disestablishments in France
Association football clubs disestablished in 2023